Bagh-e Malek County is in Khuzestan province, Iran. The capital of the county is Bagh-e Malek. At the 2006 census, the county's population was 103,217 in 19,814 households. The following census in 2011 counted 107,450 people in 23,976 households. At the 2016 census, the county's population was 105,384 in 25,872 households.

Administrative divisions

The population history and structural changes of Bagh-e Malek County's administrative divisions over three consecutive censuses are shown in the following table. The latest census shows three districts, eight rural districts, and four cities.

References

 

Counties of Khuzestan Province